Éric Vuillard (4 May 1968, Lyon) is a French writer and film director. He has made two films, L'homme qui marche and Mateo Falcone, the latter based on a story by Prosper Merimee. He is the author of Conquistadors (2009) which won the Prix de l'inaperçu in 2010. He won the Prix Goncourt in 2017 for L'Ordre du jour.

His literary works include:

 Le Chasseur, Éditions Michalon, 1999
Bois vert, Éditions Léo Scheer, 2002
Tohu, Éditions Léo Scheer, 2005
Conquistadors, Paris, Éditions Léo Scheer, 2009 (Prix Ignatius J. Reilly, 2010)
La bataille d’Occident (stories) Actes Sud, 2012 ( (Franz-Hessel-Preis 2012, Prix Littéraire Valery Larbaud 2013)
« Un endroit où aller », 2012 (Prix Franz-Hessel, 2012 ; Prix Valery-Larbaud, 2013; Prix Valery-Larbaud, 2013; finalist for the Prix Femina 2014; Prix Joseph-Kessel 2015)
Congo, récit, Arles, Actes Sud, 2016 (Franz-Hessel-Preis 2012, Valery-Larbaud Prize 2013)
Tristesse de la terre: Une histoire de Buffalo Bill Cody, récit, Arles, Actes Sud, coll. 
14 juillet, récit, Arles, Actes Sud, 2016 – Prix Alexandre-Vialatte 2017 pour 14 juillet et pour l'ensemble de son œuvre, décerné par le groupe Centre France
Tristesse de la terre (Joseph-Kessel Prize 2015)
Tristesse de la terre has been translated into English under the title Sorrow of the Earth.
 L'Ordre du jour (Prix Goncourt 2017)
The Order of the Day, English translation by Mark Polizzotti, Other Press, 2018,  (Albertine Prize shortlist 2019)
La guerre des pauvres, Actes Sud, 2019, 
The War of the Poor, English translation by Mark Polizzotti, Other Press, 2020,  (International Booker Prize shortlist 2021)

Filmography 

 2002 La vie nouvelle
 2006 L'homme qui marche
 2008 Mateo Falcone

References

Mass media people from Lyon
1968 births
21st-century French novelists
Prix Valery Larbaud winners
20th-century French non-fiction writers
French film directors
Living people
Prix Goncourt winners
Writers from Lyon